During the 20th century a number of peace walks were organized involving the citizens of the United States and the USSR.  These peace walks, or peace marches, represented citizen diplomacy initiatives promoting peace and Nuclear disarmament through direct person-to-person interaction among the citizens of the two Cold War opponent states.

San Francisco to Moscow Walk for Peace (1960-61)

A peace walk from San Francisco, US, to Moscow, USSR, took place from December 1960 to October 1961.  The walk was organized by Committee for Nonviolent Action and promoted nonviolence and unilateral nuclear disarmament.

Resources

Books and book chapters
Lyttle, Bradford. (1966). You Come with Naked Hands: The Story of the San Francisco to Moscow Walk for Peace. Raymond, N.H: Greenleaf Books.

Lehmann, J. (1966). We walked to Moscow. Raymond, N.H: Greenleaf Books.

Deming, Barabara. "The long walk for peace: new mission to Moscow". In Christman, H. M. (1964). Peace and arms. New York: Sheed and Ward.

Journal articles
Wernicke, Gunter and Wittner, Lawrence S.(1999) "Lifting the Iron Curtain: The Peace March to Moscow of 1960–1961". The International History Review, 21: 4, 900–917.

Newspaper articles
United Press International. (1961, October 4). Peace Marchers Reach Red Square but Soviet Prohibits Speeches. The New York Times, pp. 1–2.

Associated Press. (1961, October 4). Banners Urge Disarmament. The New York Times, p. 2.

Other

Syracuse Peace Council (October 16, 1961). San Francisco to Moscow. "Peace News Letter", Syracuse, NY: New York State Peace Council.

David N. Rich - San Francisco to Moscow - Walk for Peace 1960 - 1961. David N. Rich's website

1987 Leningrad to Moscow Walk
A 450-mile peace walk from Leningrad (now Saint Petersburg) to Moscow in the USSR took place from June 15 to July 8, 1987.  The walk, intended to promote peace and help end the nuclear arms race, was organized by the International Peace Walk, Inc. About 230 American and 200 Soviet citizens took part in the walk.  To mark the conclusion of the walk, the first rock concert featuring American and Soviet performers took place at the Ismailovo Stadium in Moscow on the 4 July, symbolically coinciding with the Independence Day holiday in the U.S.

Resources

Books
Segal, F., & Basten, F. E. (1988). The American Soviet walk: Taking steps to end the nuclear arms race. Santa Monica, CA: United World of the Universe Foundation.

Graham, B., & Greenfield, R. (2004). Chapter Twenty-One: Rocking Behind the Curtain, In Bill Graham presents: My life inside rock and out (pp. 491–505). New York, N.Y: Da Capo Press.

Journal articles
Brigham, S. (October 1, 2010). The American-Soviet Walks: Large-Scale Citizen Diplomacy at Glasnost's Outset. Peace & Change, 35: 4, pp. 594–625.

Newspaper articles

Houston Chronicle

Chicago Tribune

Sun Sentinel

The Washington Post

Seattle Times

Minneapolis Star and Tribune

San Francisco Chronicle

The Boston Globe

The Philadelphia Inquirer

Chicago Sun-Times

The Vancouver Sun

Los Angeles Times

Hendrix, Kathleen.  (1987, April 7). U.S.-Soviet Anti-Arms March to Moscow Planned. Los Angeles Times, p. 4.

Hendrix, Kathleen.  (1987, June 12). Mission to Moscow: Joint Venture for Peace American Contingent in Virginia Trains for Start of Walk Next week at Leningrad. Los Angeles Times, p. 1.

Hendrix, Kathleen.  (1987, June 15). Americans Embark on Person-to-Person Soviet Peace Walk. Los Angeles Times, p. 1.

Hendrix, Kathleen.  (1987, June 18). Peace Walkers Fit Fun, Friendships Into Tight Schedule. Los Angeles Times, p. 1.

Hendrix, Kathleen.  (1987, June 24). Peace Marchers Capture Soviets' Attention: Thousands Greet Walkers With Curiosity and Emotional Displays. Los Angeles Times, p. 1.

Hendrix, Kathleen.  (1987, June 26). Rain Fails to Dampen Peace March Spirit. Los Angeles Times, p. 1.

Hendrix, Kathleen.  (1987, July 1). Americans Encounter the Soviet Curious. Los Angeles Times, p. 1.

Hendrix, Kathleen.  (1987, July 3). The Peace Marchers Arrive in Moscow: Muted Welcome Suggests Parade Played Better in the Provinces. Los Angeles Times, p. 1.

Hendrix, Kathleen.  (1987, July 5). Laid-Back Listeners at Moscow Fete 1st American-Soviet Rock Concert Held. Los Angeles Times, p. 5.

Hendrix, Kathleen.  (1987, July 9). Dramatic Encounter Caps U.S.-Soviet Peace March. Los Angeles Times, p. 1.

Hilburn, Robert.  (1987, July 8). City Of Hope Honoree Graham Hopeful About More Rock With Soviets…BUT. Los Angeles Times, p. 1.

Simons, Jamie and Lapidese, Jon.  (1987, July 5). Reebok Diplomacy: Allan Affeldt of Newport Beach, the Activist Behind the Peace March on Moscow. Los Angeles Times, p. 16.

Simons, Jamie and Lapidese, Jon.  (1987, July 5). Rock in a Hard Place. Los Angeles Times, p. 20.

Willman, Chris.  (1987, October 24). Television Reviews: Rock on Cable. Los Angeles Times, p. 11.

The New York Times

Taubman, Philip. (1987, July 5). At Soviet Rock Concert, the Beat of Security. The New York Times.

Magazine articles
Janet Kinosian (July 1987). Walking for Peace. Orange Coast Magazine.

1988 From Washington D.C. to Santa Monica and to the final events in SAN FRANCISCO CA USA Walk

In June–July 1988, The American Soviet Peace Walk (ASPW) sponsored by the International Peace Walk, Inc. (IPW), organized and sponsored 230 Soviets citizens and 200 Americans from all walks of life. They started their travels from Washington, D.C. went on to Santa Monica, CA and continued on to San Francisco, to experience the America way of life.                                                                                                                                                      On July 16, 1988, the final concert was organized and produced by Summer of Love Productions Producers, Ron Frazier and Bill McCarthy, who had hosted the previous June concert event for the marchers in Los Angeles.                                                                                On July 16, 1988, the American Soviet Peace Walk concert finale event happened at the Band Shell in San Francisco's Golden Gate Park with an estimated public attendance of 25,000 plus. The Producers give many thanks to all participants, the volunteers, and performing friends of the Summer of Love 20th Anniversary 1987 series that benefited the San Francisco Food Bank and ran through to the Concert of July 16, 1988.                                                                              Congratulations are given to both the American and Soviet Performing Artists of the "American Soviet Peace Walk Concert". Participants and performances achieved the results as Change Makers that has advanced the cause for Peace and People-to-People Awareness. Artists' performances in concerts that achieve Global attention are needed as an ongoing effort to sustain awareness of and for Peace.                                                                                            Special Thanks go to; Susan Ramser, Producers Assistant who hosted the Soviet Artists on their arrival to San Francisco with the help of a Cadillac mini-fleet, Arthur Meyer, Artistic Director, and to Pete Sears of the original Jefferson Starship who assisted in the musical coordination and inviting cause-aware musician friends to participate. He organized the final musical portion of the show, as well as playing piano with each act.                                                                                                          The Crowd was pleased by Mr. Jerry Garcia helped to promote the event, Pete Sears was responsible for Jerry's appearance. The Recreation and Parks Department prohibited advertising because they  were concerned about fans camping and overcrowding, and so the concert happened without mainstream advertisement. But with the assisted word of mouth promotion, and one free newspaper paragraph event notice and the 1988 finale Poster presented 3 days out, all led to the success of the event.                                                                                                                                             Guest Artists Performers:  ALEXANDER GRADSKY, TIME MACHINE, COLLECTIVE VISION, THE TELEPHONE TRUST, YKRANIAN  WOMEN'S CHOUS, THE SOVIET YOUTH PERFORMERS…Friends of Summer of Love and special invites; BABA OLATUNJI, JERRY GARCIA. MICKEY HART, GRACE SLICK, MERL SAUNDERS, MIMI FARINA, JOHN CIPPOLINA, PETE SEARS, ZERO, NORTON BUFFALO, MARK BENNO, EMMIT POWELL & THE GOSPELL ELITES, OGIE YOCHA, and surprise guest PAUL KANTNER.                                                             The American Soviet Peace Walk 1988 Poster & Beyond Web-Wall: http://www.summeroflove.tv/

Resources

Newspaper articles

News Advisory. (1988, June 17). 220 Soviets arrive in Washington, ready to start cross-country trek. PR Newswire.

Rubin, Trudy. (1988, June 29). Soviet Press: The 'Warriors Of Perestroika'. The Philadelphia Inquirer.

Westside Digest. (1988, June 30). Santa Monica: Cross-Country March Honored. Los Angeles Times.

Ziaya, Christine.  (1988, July 8). Peace Walkers Reach High Note in Trek: Soviets, Americans Due at Concert. Los Angeles Times.

Hendrix, Kathleen.  (1988, July 15). The Great American Glasnost Tour: In a Peace Walk Across the U.S., Soviets Explore the Basics: Bikers, Barbecues and the Beach. Los Angeles Times.

1988 Odessa to Kiev Walk

About 460 American and Soviet citizens walked for peace from Odessa to Kiev in the Ukraine, USSR over five weeks in late summer of 1988.

Resources

Newspaper articles
.

Other

Martin, James. Soviet-American Peace Walk 1988. exKZ.org. Retrieved April 2, 2011.

1990 Peace Walk in the Russian North

About 80 Americans and 120 Soviets calling themselves "Russian North," participated in an international peace walk, passing through cities like Archangelsk and Severodvinsk.  The march promoted nonviolence and a ban on nuclear testing.  On the first day we went to Red Square and stayed the night in Khotkovo.

Resources

Materials Referencing Multiple Walks

This section includes materials that contain references to more than one peace walk, such as reviews of events which span longer time periods and historical trends.

Resources

Journal articles
Sherbakova, V. A. (2009) The Marches of High Hopes. Peace and Conciliation, Journal of the International Federation for Peace and Conciliation of the Russian Federation, 2: 39, 37–45. (text is in Russian language)

Subheadings:

– American-Soviet "Peace March" June 16 – July 19, 1988.

– The 20 Year Anniversary of the Soviet-American Peace Walk: Odessa-Kiev.

– Address to all governments and peoples.

– Soviet-American Meeting for Peace, October 12–18, 1990.

See also
 Peace walk
 Citizen diplomacy
 Great Peace March for Global Nuclear Disarmament

References

External links 
 Swarthmore College Peace Collection
 Our Move Information and resources on Peace Walks and the American Soviet citizen diplomacy movement against the nuclear arms race.
 International Peace Walk A collection of Los Angeles Times articles about the 1987 and 1988 Walks.
 "If I Were Gorbachev" Reflections on the 1987 and 1988 Walks published in Mandel, W. M. (1999). Ch. 26 in Saying no to power: Autobiography of a 20th-century activist and thinker. Berkeley, Calif: Creative Arts Book Co.

Anti–nuclear weapons movement
Anti-war protests in the United States
Soviet Union–United States relations
Peace marches
Nonviolence
Diplomacy